The 510s decade ran from January 1, 510, to December 31, 519.

Significant people

References

Bibliography